Tiglath-Pileser I (from the Hebraic form of , "my trust is in the son of Ešarra") was a king of Assyria during the Middle Assyrian period (1114–1076 BC). According to Georges Roux, Tiglath-Pileser was "one of the two or three great Assyrian monarchs since the days of Shamshi-Adad I". He was known for his "wide-ranging military campaigns, his enthusiasm for building projects, and his interest in cuneiform tablet collections". Under him, Assyria became the leading power of the Ancient Near East, a position the kingdom largely maintained for the next five hundred years. He expanded Assyrian control into Anatolia and Syria, and to the shores of the Mediterranean Sea. From his surviving inscriptions, he seems to have carefully cultivated a fear of himself in his subjects and in his enemies alike.

The beginning of Tiglath-Pileser's I reign, laid heavy involvement in military campaigns, as suggested from translated texts from the Middle Assyrian period. The texts were believed to be "justification of war."  Although little literary text is available from the time of Tiglath-Pileser I, there is evidence to show that the reign of Tiglath-Pileser I inspired the act of recording information, including that of his military campaigns. Toward the end of Tiglath-Pileser's reign literary texts took the form of "summary texts" which served as a vessel for as much information about his reign as possible, with the intent to be handed down to his successor.

Campaigns
The son of Ashur-resh-ishi I, he ascended to the throne in 1115 BC, and became one of the greatest of Assyrian conquerors. Tiglath-Pileser I referred to himself as "unrivalled king of the universe, king of the four quarters, king of all princes, lord of lords… whose weapons the god Assur has sharpened and whose name he has pronounced eternally for control of the four quarters… splendid flame which covers the hostile land like a rain storm". Alongside this view of himself, he emphasized the brutality of his  takeover of numerous lands, and was the first Assyrian king to claim hostages, occasionally children, as a political instrument against conquered peoples.

His first campaign was against the Mushku in 1112 BC, who had occupied certain Assyrian districts in the Upper Euphrates; then he overran Commagene and eastern Cappadocia, and drove the Hittites from the Assyrian province of Subartu, northeast of Malatia.

In a subsequent campaign, the Assyrian forces penetrated into the mountains south of Lake Van and then turned westward to receive the submission of Malatia. In his fifth year, Tiglath-Pileser attacked Comana in Cappadocia, and placed a record of his victories engraved on copper plates in a fortress he built to secure his Cilician conquests.

The Arameans emerged in a region which was largely under the domination of the Middle Assyrian Empire (1365–1050 BC) and quickly posed a threat to the Assyrian polity which was largely located west of the Euphrates. In order to nullify this threat, Tiglath-Pileser I performed many campaigns in Aramean territory, although the numerous campaigns that the Assyrian records recorded that he took indicate that Assyrian military campaigns were unsuccessful at exercising power or dominance over the Arameans. Some scholars believe that the Arameans took Nineveh in this time. In the 11th century BC, Assyria fell into decline which may have been caused by the incursions of the emerging Arameans, allowing the Arameans to establish a string of states across the Levant and make notable expansions into Assyrian territory in this time such as in the Khabur Valley. For the time being, Assyria was unable to expand east of the Euphrates.

The control of the high road to the Mediterranean was secured by the possession of the Hittite town of Pitru at the junction between the Euphrates and Sajur; thence he proceeded to Gubal (Byblos), Sidon, and finally to Arvad where he embarked onto a ship to sail the Mediterranean, on which he killed a nahiru or "sea-horse" (which A. Leo Oppenheim translates as a narwhal) in the sea. 

The general view is that the restoration of the temple of the gods Ashur and Hadad at Assyrian capital of  Assur was one of his initiatives. It is also believed he was one of the first Assyrian kings to commission parks and gardens with foreign trees and plants.

The latter part of his reign seems to have been a period of retrenchment, as Aramaean tribesmen put pressure on his realm. He died in 1076 BC and was succeeded by his son Asharid-apal-Ekur. The later kings Ashur-bel-kala and Shamshi-Adad IV were also his sons.

Annals and texts 
Tiglath-Pileser's I inscriptions from his "fifth year annals" varied in form, from inscriptions on prisms to cuneiform inscriptions on tablets. A.0.87.i (or RIMA 2) was inscribed on a multiple 8-sided prisms and included 6 military campaigns that Marco De Odorico affirms as easily identifiable given that "the subdivision of paragraphs by horizontal lines... as well as the introduction begin with 'in my succession year'".

Considering that much of Tiglath-Pileser I's reign involved military campaigns, it is unsurprising that most of his literary texts would include such information as "Altogether I conquered 42 lands and their rulers from the other side of the Lower Zab in distant mountainous regions to the other side of the Euphrates, people of Hatti, and the Upper Sea in the west – from my accession year to my fifth regnal year."  Tiglath-Pileser I's prism was essentially a year-by-year layout of his military campaigns, and today is considered one of the world's first-preserved annals.

Returning from the campaigns 
Tiglath-Pileser I's annals contain military campaign documentation, as well as other information such as what Tiglath-Pileser I would bring back in an early form of tribute, from the various locations he showed military strength over. Once returned from a successful war campaign Tiglath-Pileser I is said to have had statues of the various animals he had come into contact with as well as hunted. From the translated annals text, it is said that Tiglath-Pileser I had "2 nāhirū (horse of the sea)  sculptures, 4 burhiš sculptures, 4 lions constructed of basalt, 2 bull colossi made of alabaster, 2 burhiš sculptures made of white limestone and had them set up at the gates in the City of Ashur"

These statues were mainly used to decorate the "royal entrance", a practice that was taken up by Tiglath-Pileser I's son Aššur-bel-kala after his father's passing. In addition to erecting statues of animals his people had never seen, Tiglath-Pileser I returned from some war campaigns with the living animals themselves, including calves of wild bulls as well as elephants.

See also

 Tiglath-Pileser II
 Tiglath-Pileser III

References

Bibliography

Attribution:

External links
 Inscription of Tiglath-Pileser I. Babylonian and Assyrian Literature. Project Gutemberg.
 Inscription of Tiglath-Pileser I, Babylonian and Assyrian Literature, at Internet Archive
 Prism of Tiglat Pileser I, at the British Museum.
Assyrian origins: discoveries at Ashur on the Tigris: antiquities in the Vorderasiatisches Museum, Berlin, an exhibition catalog from The Metropolitan Museum of Art Libraries (fully available online as PDF), which contains material on Tiglath-Pileser I

12th-century BC Assyrian kings
11th-century BC Assyrian kings
12th-century BC births
1076 BC deaths
Year of birth unknown
Late Bronze Age collapse